Senate Bill 1953 was introduced on February 25, 1994. It was signed into law on September 21, 1994. The bill establishes a seismic safety building standards program under OSHPD's jurisdiction for California hospitals built after March 7, 1973. Almost 50% of California's hospitals may have to be retrofitted, reconstructed, or closed to meet the new requirements.

References

1994 in American law